Nine Lives is a 2005 American drama film written and directed by Rodrigo García. The screenplay, an example of hyperlink cinema, relates nine short, loosely intertwined tales with nine different women at their cores. Their themes include parent-child relationships, fractured love, adultery, illness, and death. Similar to García's previous work, Things You Can Tell Just by Looking at Her, it is a series of overlapping vignettes, each one running about the same length and told in a single, unbroken take, featuring an ensemble cast.

Plot
The story centers on nine stories, each revolving around different women. Imprisoned Sandra has an emotional breakdown when the broken telephone in her cubicle prevents her from communicating with her daughter on visiting day. Diana and Damian, two former flames now married to others, unexpectedly have a poignant reunion in the aisle of the local supermarket. Holly returns home to confront her sexually abusive stepfather and dissolves into gun-waving hysteria. Sonia and Martin, a feuding married couple, have an emotional meltdown while visiting their friends Lisa and Damian in their new apartment. Teenaged Samantha is torn between her non-communicative parents Ruth and Larry, each of whom questions her about everything the other one has to say. Ruth, who is the primary caretaker for her wheelchair-using husband, becomes increasingly guilt-ridden during a tryst with drunken widower Henry in a hotel. 

Meanwhile, divorcée Lorna must cope with her ex-husband Andrew's sexual desire for her during his second wife's funeral. Camille is facing breast cancer surgery and uses her waiting time to lash out at her quietly supportive husband Richard. Maggie discusses life with her daughter Maria during a picnic in the cemetery and realizes how much she needs the little girl's loving comfort.

Cast

The Nine Women

Supporting players

Release
The film premiered at the Sundance Film Festival in January 2005 and was shown at the Los Angeles Film Festival and the Locarno Film Festival, where it won the Golden Leopard for Best Film and the entire cast was awarded the Bronze Leopard for Best Actress, before going into limited release in the US in October. It opened on seven screens and earned $28,387 in its opening weekend. It eventually grossed $478,830 in the US and $1,112,693 in foreign markets for a total worldwide box office of $1,591,523.

Reception
Review aggregator Rotten Tomatoes reports a score of 76% from 86 critics. The critical consensus reads, "Nine Lives is bolstered by a strong cast and features many insightful glimpses into the lives of women". Metacritic gave score a film of 80 based on 25 reviews, indicating "generally favorable reviews".

Stephen Holden of The New York Times described it as "a film that may be the closest movies have come to the cinematic equivalent of a collection of Chekhov short stories. The film's reward for intense concentration is a feeling of deep empathy and connection. For once, you don't harbor the uneasy suspicion of having been emotionally manipulated ... Mr. García has made a film that could be described as radically realistic ... In its subtle, understated performances, the actors vanish into characters who behave like ordinary people observed through one-way glass."

Roger Ebert of the Chicago Sun-Times said, "Rodrigo Garcia ... the son of the novelist Gabriel Garcia Marquez ... has the same love for his characters, and although his stories are all (except for one) realistic, he shares his father's appreciation for the ways lives interweave and we touch each other even if we are strangers. A movie like this, with the appearance of new characters and situations, focuses us; we watch more intently, because it is important what happens."

Ruthe Stein of the San Francisco Chronicle called the film "an emotionally satisfying example of a genre whose sketchiness can be off-putting" and added, "García knows how to create juicy roles for actresses, and they return the favor with performances of such concentrated intensity that you cannot take your eyes off them."

Michael Wilmington of the Chicago Tribune awarded the film four out of five stars, describing it as "one of the most interesting and original American films out right now" and "a disturbingly frank look at people and relationships in contemporary Los Angeles and a thrilling dramatic showcase for a brilliant cast." He added, "[The] stories might seem the stuff of soap opera, but Garcia and his superb cast turn most of them into dramatic gold. The peculiar overall structure makes them distinctive as well, the way these little semi-Chekhovian, semi-Andre Dubus pieces play out against each other."

Kevin Thomas of the Los Angeles Times called it "that rare episode film that actually accrues a cumulative power and doesn't merely proceed from one segment to the next. By the time it's over it has become a testament to the inner resilience of women in coping with a critical moment in their lives ... Each segment seems perfectly shaped and timed, not lasting a second too long yet always of sufficient length to be satisfying in itself. García's large ensemble cast is impeccable, and he and his actors have created a film as memorable as it is subtle ... Nine Lives is a sophisticated, elegant-looking film shot in distinctive, wide-ranging L.A. locales, but its real terrain is the human heart, explored with compassion and respect."

Accolades
Satellite Award for Best Actress - Motion Picture Drama (Robin Wright Penn, nominee)
Satellite Award for Best Original Screenplay (nominee)
ALMA Award for Outstanding Supporting Actress in a Motion Picture (Elpidia Carrillo, winner)
ALMA Award for Director of a Motion Picture (nominee)
National Board of Review Award for Excellence In Filmmaking (winner)
Independent Spirit Award for Best Director (nominee)
Independent Spirit Award for Best Screenplay (nominee)
Independent Spirit Award for Best Supporting Actress (Robin Wright Penn, nominee)
Gotham Independent Film Award for Best Ensemble Cast (nominee)

See also
 List of American films of 2005

References

External links
 
 
Nine Lives at AllMovie
Nine Lives at Metacritic

2005 films
2005 drama films
American drama films
American Sign Language films
Films scored by Edward Shearmur
Films set in California
Films directed by Rodrigo García
American anthology films
Golden Leopard winners
Incest in film
Hyperlink films
Magnolia Pictures films
2005 independent films
2000s English-language films
2000s American films